Blasto (born Otis Chilamba) is a popular reggae and dancehall singer from Lilongwe, Malawi. His recordings include Stronger (2014) and  Persistence (2017). He is colloquially known as the "humble king of dancehall" in Malawi.

References 

21st-century Malawian male singers
Year of birth missing (living people)
Living people